The Association for Social Promotion of the Masses (APROSOMA) was a political party in Rwanda.

History
The party was established on 15 February 1959 by Joseph Gitera alongside friends and former schoolmates. Although it initially promoted social improvement for both Hutu and Tutsi, it later became an anti-Tutsi party.

APROSOMA contested the pre-independence elections in 1961, receiving 3.6% of the vote and winning two seats. In 1965 the country became a one-party state under MDR-Parmehutu.

References

Defunct political parties in Rwanda
1959 establishments in Rwanda
Political parties established in 1959